2011 Regional League Division 2 Bangkok Metropolitan Region is the 3rd season of the League competition since its establishment in 2009. It is in the third tier of the Thai football league system.

Changes from Last Season

Team Changes

Promoted Clubs

Bangkok  and Rangsit JW were promoted to the 2011 Thai Division 1 League after winning the 2009 Regional League Division 2 championship pool.

Relegated Clubs

Prachinburi were relegated from the 2010 Thai Division 1 League.

Withdrawn Clubs

North-Central have withdrawn from the 2011 campaign. were effectively relegated from the division due to failure to meet Regional League standards.

Renamed Clubs

 Thai Summit Samut Prakan renamed Samut Prakan United.
 Nakhon Sawan Rajabhat University renamed Paknampho NSRU.
 Rose Asia United Thanyaburi renamed Thanyaburi RA United.

Expansion Clubs

Globlex, Maptaphut Rayong, Assumption College Thonburi, Royal Thai Fleet and Chamchuri United joined the newly expanded league setup.

Stadium and Locations

League table

Results

References

External links
  Football Association of Thailand

Bang
Regional League Bangkok Area Division seasons